George Allan (1885 – 14 March 1916) was a Scottish professional footballer who played as a half back in the Scottish League for Partick Thistle and Ayr United.

Personal life 
Allan's military service during the First World War began in the Highland Light Infantry. After being commissioned into the London Regiment as a second lieutenant, he was killed in a training accident at Morn Hill Camp, outside Winchester, on 14 March 1916. Whilst being taught how to fire a West Spring Gun, Allan was hit in the face by a trench bomb and died of wounds 10 minutes later. He was buried in Mauchline Cemetery.

Career statistics

References 

1885 births
1916 deaths
20th-century Scottish military personnel
British Army personnel of World War I
Partick Thistle F.C. players
Scottish footballers
People from Mauchline
Scottish Football League players
Association football wing halves
Ayr United F.C. players
London Regiment officers
British military personnel killed in World War I
Military personnel from East Ayrshire
Burials in Scotland
Highland Light Infantry soldiers